Between Hope and History: Meeting America's Challenges for the 21st Century is a 1996 book by then-incumbent United States President Bill Clinton. It was published by Random House in September 1996 in the lead up to the 1996 US presidential election, partly as a means to reach out to the electorate.

The New York Times Book Review described it as "A snapshot of President Clinton's "New Democratic" philosophy as he segues from his first to (he hopes) his second term."

References

1996 non-fiction books
Books by Bill Clinton
Books about the Clinton administration
Random House books
Books written by presidents of the United States